VEB Kombinat Mikroelektronik Erfurt was an important manufacturer of active electronic components in East Germany. It should not be confused with the more well-known VEB Kombinat Robotron Dresden which used integrated circuits from Kombinat Mikroelektronik in its computers.

Their products often carried the trademark , but this was used on most electronic products from East Germany from otherwise unrelated companies.

History
The Kombinat Mikroelektronik Erfurt was formed in 1978 when the VVB Bauelemente und Vakuumtechnik was split into VEB Kombinat Elektronische Bauelemente Teltow for passive electronic components and VEB Kombinat Mikroelektronik Erfurt for active electronic components. However, the history of many of the individual plants reaches back further, in some cases to before the Second World War. In 1971 the first integrated circuits had been manufactured — the D100C (TTL) by Halbleiterwerk Frankfurt (Oder) and the U101D (PMOS logic) by Funkwerk Erfurt. To put this into perspective, the first TTL circuits went into production in the US 10 years and at Siemens in West Germany 5 years before East Germany. The first microprocessor, the U808D, followed in 1978, 6 years after the Intel 8008 that the U808 was cloned from. Further milestones were the U880 (Zilog Z80 clone) in 1980 and the first 16-bit microprocessor U8000 (Zilog Z8000 clone) in 1984. The ruling Socialist Unity Party of Germany had identified the development of the microelectronics sector as a primary goal. Huge sums were spent in order to catch up to the West — between 1986 and 1990 about 7% of the country-wide industry investment. However, this effort was hampered by several factors: the general inefficiency of the planned economy, insufficient cooperation with other Comecon countries, and western CoCom export restrictions that prevented the importation of semiconductor manufacturing equipment. Nonetheless, the development program achieved samples of a 1Mbit dRAM chip (U61000) in 1988 and a 32-bit processor (U80701) in 1989. Mikroelektronik "Karl Marx" Erfurt achieved a feature size of 3 µm on 4-inch wafers in 1984 (plant ESO I), 2.5 µm in 1988 (plant ESO II), and 1.5 µm on 5-inch wafers in 1990 (plant ESO III). In 1989, Halbleiterwerk Frankfurt (Oder) produced 110 million integrated circuits and Mikroelektronik "Karl Marx" Erfurt produced 35 million.

After 1990
Following the German reunification, Kombinat Mikroelektronik was dissolved and operated for a time as a holding company under the name PTC-electronic AG which was 100% owned by the Treuhandanstalt. Most products from Kombinat Mikroelektronik could not be sold on the world market and many plants were liquidated by the Treuhandanstalt in 1991.

The Thesys Gesellschaft für Mikroelektronik mbH and the X-FAB Gesellschaft zur Fertigung von Wafern mbH were created in 1992 from parts of VEB Mikroelektronik "Karl Marx" Erfurt (which had operated under the name ERMIC GmbH from 1990 until 1992). In 1999 both companies were combined as X-FAB Semiconductor Foundries GmbH. In 2007, X-FAB took over another former part of Kombinat Mikroelektronik: the foundry of the former VEB ZFTM Dresden. ZFTM Dresden had become Zentrum Mikroelektronik Dresden GmbH (ZMD) in 1993. After several ownership changes and the sale of the foundry to X-FAB, ZMD was renamed to ZMDI and the remaining fab-less design house was ultimately sold to Integrated Device Technology in 2015. Not far from Dresden in Freiberg, the wafer production of VEB Spurenmetalle continued through Siltronic and Freiberger Compound Materials GmbH. Together with TU Dresden, VEB ZFTM and VEB Spurenmetalle formed the foundation for Silicon Saxony, a cluster of microelectronics companies that came to include new fabs by Siemens (later Infineon Technologies) and AMD (later GlobalFoundries).

The Frankfurt (Oder) region did not fare as well. VEB Halbleiterwerk was succeeded, in turn, by Halbleiterwerk GmbH, System Microelectronic Innovation GmbH (SMI), Silicon Microelectronic Integration GmbH (SiMI), Megaxess GmbH Deutschland, and Microtechnology Services Frankfurt (Oder) GmbH (MSF), each with less employees than its predecessor. The website of MSF disappeared around 2009. Construction on a new semiconductor plant, Communicant Semiconductor Technologies, had started already but this endeavour collapsed in 2003. Only IHP, the research institute that had supported VEB Halbleiterwerk, remained after that.

At VEB Werk für Fernsehelektronik Berlin, the production of electronic tubes and optoelectronics was shut down step by step until only the relatively modern manufacturing of colour CRTs remained. In 1993 the CRT manufacturing was taken over by Samsung SDI. In 2005, when LCD screens largely replaced CRTs, the plant was shut down entirely.

VEB Mikroelektronik "Karl Liebknecht" Stahnsdorf became Leistungselektronik Stahnsdorf AG (LES AG) which was liquidated by the Treuhandanstalt in 1992. The semiconductor manufacturing was sold to Indian investors and continued under the name Lesag HBB. When the investors withdrew in the middle of the 1990s, the number of employees had fallen from 3000 in 1989 to 79. In 1996, several former employees founded SeCoS Halbleitertechnologie GmbH to continue semiconductor manufacturing in Stahnsdort. By 2001, the patents and rights of SeCoS were transferred to SeCoS Corporation in Taiwan. Only the small group developing silicon pressure sensors survived in Stahnsdorf and was acquired by Endress+Hauser.

In Neuhaus am Rennweg, the SMD packaging of VEB Mikroelektronik "Anna Seghers" became part of Zetex Semiconductors which was in turn acquired by Diodes Incorporated.

Divisions
The Kombinat consisted of a number of plants across East Germany (listed with their production profile in 1989):
 VEB Mikroelektronik "Karl Marx" Erfurt (MME), before 1983 Funkwerk Erfurt (FWE) — Kombinat headquarters; NMOS and CMOS digital integrated circuits
 VEB Halbleiterwerk Frankfurt (Oder) (HFO) — bipolar analogue and digital integrated circuits, mixed-signal integrated circuits, CMOS integrated circuits, low-power bipolar junction transistors
 VEB Mikroelektronik "Anna Seghers" Neuhaus am Rennweg, before 1981 Röhrenwerk Neuhaus am Rennweg (RWN) — bipolar junction transistors
 VEB Mikroelektronik "Karl Liebknecht" Stahnsdorf (MLS), before 1981 Gleichrichterwerk Stahnsdorf (GWS) — power semiconductor devices (silicon rectifier diodes, bipolar junction transistors), pressure sensors
 VEB Mikroelektronik "Robert Harnau" Großräschen, former Gleichrichterwerk Großräschen — selenium rectifiers and silicon rectifier diodes
 VEB Werk für Fernsehelektronik Berlin (WF) — CRTs, LEDs, LCDs, optoelectronics
 VEB Mikroelektronik "Wilhelm Pieck" Mühlhausen (MPM), before 1982 Röhrenwerk Mühlhausen — low-power diodes (including Zener diodes); also KC85 series home computers, pocket calculators
 VEB Röhrenwerk Rudolstadt, before 1961 Phönix Röntgenröhrenwerk Rudolstadt — X-ray tubes
 VEB Applikationszentrum Elektronik Berlin (AEB) — import of electronic components, documentation, application support
 VEB Mikroelektronik "Friedrich Engels" Ilmenau, before 1983 Elektroglas Ilmenau — semiconductor packages
 VEB Mikroelektronik Secura-Werke Berlin — components for CRTs; also photocopiers
 VEB Mikroelektronik "Bruno Baum" Zehdenick, before 1977 Isolierwerk Zehdenick — punched parts, insulating materials
 VEB Spurenmetalle Freiberg — silicon and gallium arsenide wafers
 VEB Glaskolbenwerk Weißwasser — glass envelopes for CRTs

Two plants from Kombinat Mikroelektronik were moved to VEB Kombinat "Carl Zeiss" Jena in 1986:
 VEB Zentrum für Forschung und Technologie Mikroelektronik Dresden (ZFTM) — development and pilot production of integrated circuits
 VEB Hochvakuum Dresden — equipment for physical vapor deposition

The East German clock and watch industry formed part of the Kombinat Mikroelektronik as the Leitbereich Uhren (Clock Directorate) with a number of plants:
 VEB Uhrenwerke Ruhla — also CMOS integrated circuits, primarily for watches and clocks
 VEB Uhrenwerk Glashütte
 VEB Uhrenwerk Weimar
 VEB Plastverarbeitung Eisenach
 VEB Feinwerktechnik Dresden

Products

Microprocessors

The U830, U8032, U8047, and U320C20 were manufactured by ZFTM Dresden while all other processors came from Mikroelektronik "Karl Marx" Erfurt.
 U808 — 8-bit microprocessor, clone of the Intel 8008
 U830 — asynchronous 8-bit processor slice for PDP-11 compatible computers, no international equivalent
 U8032 — 16-bit arithmetic coprocessor slice, no international equivalent
 U840 – microcontroller for boolean bit processing, no international equivalent
 U880 — 8-bit microprocessor, clone of the Zilog Z80
 U881 through U886 — 8-bit microcontrollers, clones of the Zilog Z8
 U8000 — 16-bit microprocessors, clones of the Zilog Z8000
 U8047 — 4-bit microcontroller
 U84C00 — 8-bit microprocessor, CMOS version of the Zilog Z80, pilot production only
 U80601 — 16-bit microprocessor, clone of the Intel 80286, pilot production only
 U80701 — 32-bit microprocessor, clone of the MicroVAX 78032, pilot production only
 U320C20 — 16-bit digital signal processor, CMOS version of the Texas Instruments TMS32020, pilot production only

Other components

Consumer goods

Semiconductor designation
The type designations for both discrete semiconductor devices and integrated circuits were specified in state standard TGL 38015. The designations for discrete semiconductors are similar to the Pro Electron specification and are discussed there.

The type designation for integrated circuits initially (in 1971) consisted of one letter for the basic type and temperature range, a three-digit type number, and one letter for the package type. Over time this proved inflexible and the plants started adding letters for further temperature ranges, speed classes, etc. (e.g. a second letter after the basic type to indicate the speed class of a processor, as in UD8820M). In order to curb these somewhat uncoordinated extensions and also out of a desire to keep the type numbers in common with international equivalents, the standard was revised in 1986 (the revision came into force in April 1987). Almost arbitrary type numbers were allowed now , including additional letters in the type number if the international equivalent had them (e.g. U74HCT02DK). The temperature range was added as a separate letter at the end. A 2-digit number could follow the temperature letter in order to indicate the maximum clock frequency of a microprocessor (in MHz, e.g U880DC08) or the access time of a memory circuit (in units of nanoseconds or tens of nanoseconds, e.g. U60998CC12). Existing type designations were kept even if they did not fully conform to the new standard (e.g. V4028D). Integrated circuits that did not meet the official specifications, were sold as hobbyist versions. More often than not, these were the only versions available to hobbyists. Before 1987 the hobbyist versions were assigned separate basic type letters while keeping the type number (e.g. an A109D that did not meet its specifications would become an R109D). From 1987 onwards, S1 was appended to the unchanged type designation for hobbyist versions (e.g. U6516D S1).

New package type letters were added in 1987 while the previously defined letters remained unchanged.

In the early years all integrated circuit packages were manufactured with a spacing of 2.5 mm between pins just like in the Soviet Union and unlike the 2.54 mm (1/10") spacing used in the West. Over time more and more circuits with 16 or more pins were produced with a 2.54 mm spacing. Where a certain circuit was available with either of the two spacings, TGL 38015 required that the version with a 2.54 mm spacing be marked with the letter "Z" (for ) on the package.

The temperature range letter was introduced only in 1987 and therefore not many integrated circuits were labelled with it.

Beside the type designation the manufacturing date was printed on integrated circuits. From 1978 onwards the IEC 60062 letter and digit code was used for manufacturing date (the respective state standard TGL 31667 does not mention IEC 60062 but the encoding is identical).

Following the dissolution of Kombinat Mikroelektronik in 1990, the plants in Frankfurt (Oder) and Erfurt kept using the East German integrated circuit designation until 1992 while ZMD in Dresden applied a slightly modified version until about 2005 (albeit with the date code in a 4-digit year/month format since 1991).

The East German integrated circuit designation was also used by Componentes Electrónicos "Ernesto Che Guevara" in Pinar del Río in the late 1980s (e.g. A210).

See also
 Electronics industry in East Germany
 VEB Robotron

External links

References

Home computer hardware companies
Volkseigene Betriebe
Defunct companies of Germany
Science and technology in East Germany
Electronics companies of Germany
Semiconductor companies of Germany